Michael Gregoritsch (born 18 April 1994) is an Austrian professional footballer who plays as a winger or striker for Bundesliga club  SC Freiburg and the Austria national team.

Career

Kapfenberger SV 
In 2008, Gregoritsch began his career at Kapfenberger SV's youth teams and was promoted to the Austrian Bundesliga team in January 2010. He made his debut on 14 April 2010 against Austria Wien and scored his first league goal less than three minutes after coming on as an 82nd-minute substitute. This made him the youngest goalscorer in the history of the Austrian Bundesliga with only 15 years and 361 days. He finished the 2009–10 season with a goal in four appearances. He also made appearances for the reserve team over three seasons.

1899 Hoffenheim 
Gregoritsch moved to 1899 Hoffenheim on 28 June 2011 for an undisclosed fee. He signed a four-year contract but was loaned to Kapfenberger SV until June 2012. He then only played for the second team of Hoffenheim, where he scored 11 goals in 28 appearances.

FC St. Pauli 
In 2013, he was loaned to FC St. Pauli, where he played for both the first and second teams.

VfL Bochum 
He joined VfL Bochum on loan for the 2014–15 season, where he scored seven goals in 27 appearances.

Hamburger SV 
He played for Hamburger SV during the 2015–16 and 2016–17 seasons. He scored six goals in 26 appearances during the 2015–16 season and five goals in 32 appearances during the 2016–17 season.

FC Augsburg 
He went to FC Augsburg for the 2017–18 season. He finished the 2017–18 season with 13 goals in 33 appearances.

Schalke 04 (loan)
On 23 December 2019, Gregoritsch was loaned to Schalke 04 until the end of the campaign. In his debut match for Schalke on 17 January 2020, he recorded a goal and an assist in a 2–0 home win against Borussia Mönchengladbach.

SC Freiburg
On 8 July 2022, SC Freiburg announced that they had signed Gregoritsch ahead of the 2022–23 Bundesliga season.

Personal life 
As of June 2021, his father, Werner Gregoritsch, is the head coach of the Austrian under-21 national team.

Career statistics

Club

International

Scores and results list Austria's goal tally first, score column indicates score after each Gregoritsch goal.

References

External links

1994 births
Living people
Footballers from Graz
Association football midfielders
Association football forwards
Austrian footballers
Austria international footballers
Austria youth international footballers
Austria under-21 international footballers
Kapfenberger SV players
TSG 1899 Hoffenheim players
TSG 1899 Hoffenheim II players
FC St. Pauli players
VfL Bochum players
Hamburger SV players
FC Augsburg players
FC Schalke 04 players
Bundesliga players
Austrian Football Bundesliga players
2. Bundesliga players
Regionalliga players
UEFA Euro 2020 players
Austrian expatriate footballers
Austrian expatriate sportspeople in Germany
Expatriate footballers in Germany